Enoch Emmanuel Lewis (born 2 October 1954) is a West Indies former cricketer. He was born in Antigua and played for the Combined Islands and the Leeward Islands teams in the 1970s and 1980s.

References

External links
 
 

1955 births
Living people
Antigua and Barbuda cricketers
Combined Islands cricketers
Leeward Islands cricketers